In United States law, absolute immunity is a type of sovereign immunity for government officials that confers complete immunity from criminal prosecution and suits for damages, so long as officials are acting within the scope of their duties. The Supreme Court of the United States has consistently held that government officials deserve some type of immunity from lawsuits for damages, and that the common law recognized this immunity. The Court reasons that this immunity is necessary to protect public officials from excessive interference with their responsibilities and from "potentially disabling threats of liability."

Absolute immunity contrasts with qualified immunity, which sometimes applies when certain officials may have violated constitutional rights or federal law.

Types 
In the United States, absolute civil immunity applies to the following people and circumstances:

 lawmakers engaged in the legislative process;
 judges acting in their judicial capacity;
 government prosecutors while making charging decisions;
 executive officers while performing adjudicative functions;
 the President of the United States;
 Presidential aides who first show that the functions of their office are so sensitive as to require absolute immunity, and who then show that they were performing those functions when performing the act at issue;
 witnesses while testifying in court (although they are still subject to perjury);
 lawyers in certain circumstances related to fraud

Presidential immunity 
Although the U.S. president is sued daily in his governmental capacity, he normally is not sued in his personal capacity as being personally liable. In 1982, the Supreme Court held in Nixon v. Fitzgerald that the president enjoys absolute immunity from civil litigation for official acts undertaken while he or she is president. The Court suggested that this immunity was broad (though not limitless), applying to acts within the "outer perimeter" of the president's official duties. Fifteen years after Fitzgerald, the Supreme Court held in Clinton v. Jones that the president does not possess absolute immunity from civil litigation surrounding acts he carried out that were not part of his official duties (which is often incorrectly presented as referring only to acts carried out before becoming president). The 2020 Supreme Court decision in Trump v. Vance held that the president is subject to subpoenas in criminal prosecutions for personal conduct with the same legal threshold as anyone else. 

There is also widespread agreement that no one is above the law and that the president does not have immunity for words and acts carried out while president that are not part of official duties, for example speeding (President Grant) or incitement to prevent Congress's certification of election results and the peaceful transition of power. However, since 1973, the Office of Legal Counsel of the Department of Justice has established the policy that a sitting president may be investigated for crimes but that prosecution for these and other possible crimes must wait until the president is no longer in office.

Prosecutorial immunity 

In 1976, the Supreme Court ruled in Imbler v. Pachtman that prosecutors cannot be sued for injuries caused by their official actions during trial. For instance, a prosecutor cannot be sued for purposely withholding exculpatory evidence, even if that act results in a wrongful conviction. Absolute prosecutorial immunity also exists for acts closely related to the criminal process' judicial phase.

However, the Supreme Court has held that prosecutors do not enjoy absolute immunity when they act as investigators by engaging in activities associated more closely with police functions. Further, the U.S. Court of Appeals for the First Circuit recently held that a prosecutor is not entitled to absolute prosecutorial discretion when performing purely administrative functions concerning a criminal prosecution. Additionally, the Seventh Circuit has ruled that a prosecutor is not immune from liability for fabricating evidence during pre-trial investigations and then introducing that evidence at trial.

Judicial immunity 

Absolute judicial immunity applies when judges act in their judicial capacity. A judge enjoys this immunity when they exceed their jurisdiction, but not when they act without any jurisdiction. Judicial immunity also extends to non-judges when they act in a judicial or quasi-judicial capacity, such as a court-appointed referee in an equitable distribution case. Determining whether someone is acting in a judicial capacity and thus deserves absolute immunity requires using a functional test; that is, one must determine whether the person is acting functionally similarly to a judge.

Testimonial immunity 
In 2019, the Trump administration resisted efforts by House Democrats to compel Trump aides to testify, asserting that close aides to the president enjoy absolute immunity from providing testimony to Congress. But a federal judge ruled against the administration, stating that close presidential advisors—even those working in national security—do not possess absolute immunity from testifying in congressional inquiries, though these officials may invoke executive privilege whenever it is appropriate. The U.S. Department of Justice is appealing the decision. Previously, both Republican and Democratic presidential administrations had asserted absolute immunity in contexts like this, but the doctrine has been mostly untested in the judiciary.

Controversy 
Some scholars urge courts to reconsider the scope of certain forms of absolute immunity, particularly prosecutorial immunity. They insist that absolute prosecutorial immunity is not supported by either public policy or history, and that applying this doctrine in everyday situations is needlessly unworkable. Meanwhile, others push back, arguing that prosecutorial immunity is necessary to protect public servants from frivolous lawsuits.

See also 
Sovereign immunity
Qualified immunity

Notes 

American legal terminology
Legal immunity
Common law legal terminology